The 1980 CRC Chemicals 300 was a Touring Car race staged at Amaroo Park Raceway in New South Wales, Australia on 10 August 1980.
The race, which was organised by the Australian Racing Drivers Club, was contested over 155 laps, a total distance of 300.7 km (185.8 miles).
It was a non-championship event which did not count towards either the 1980 Australian Touring Car Championship or the 1980 Australian Championship of Makes.

The race was won by  Peter Brock and John Harvey driving a Holden Commodore entered by the Marlboro Holden Dealer Team.

Results

Notes
 Entries in Official Programme: 40
 Starters: Unknown
 Race time of winning car: 2h 31m 33.5s
 Winning margin: 44.5s

References

CRC Chemicals 300
1980 CRC Chemicals 300